Hank Williams' discography is composed of 31 singles and 2 ten-inch LPs released during his six-year career; as well as posthumous work including: singles, compilation albums and previously unreleased material. During his lifetime, Williams placed 30 songs on Billboard's Top C&W Records, while he had eleven number one hits.

After being signed with the help of Fred Rose to Sterling Records, Williams assisted his debut recording session on December 11, 1946 at Castle Recording Laboratory's studio D in Nashville, Tennessee. The singer cut four songs, returning later on February 13, 1947 to cut four new sides. His first single, "Never Again (Will I Knock on Your Door)" backed with "Calling You" was released in January 1947.
Not satisfied with Sterling, and upon learning of the creation of MGM Records by the Loews Corporation, Fred Rose negotiated a deal for Williams. Rose bought the Sterling masters, became  Williams' manager and signed him to the label, agreeing to record all of his sessions in Nashville. By June 1947, Williams debuted on the MGM label with "Move it On Over" backed with "(Last Night) I Heard You Crying in Your Sleep". The release quickly became a hit.

On September 23, 1952, Williams cut his final session, recording "Your Cheatin' Heart", "Kaw-Liga", "I Could Never Be Ashamed of You" and "Take These Chains from My Heart". Williams' last single during his lifetime, "I'll Never Get Out of This World Alive" backed with "I Could Never Be Ashamed of You" was released on November 21, 1952. From 1947 to 1952, MGM Records released 27 singles by Williams, five of which turned into million sellers. "Kaw-Liga", "Your Cheatin' Heart" and "Take These Chains From My Heart" became posthumous number-one singles.

Studio albums

Posthumously released albums

Studio albums

Live albums

Compilation albums

Collaborations

Singles

Posthumously released singles

References

Footnotes

Bibliography

External links
Hank Williams — A Comprehensive Discography

Williams, Hank
 
Discographies of American artists